The Lloydminster Border Kings are a Senior AAA ice hockey team based in Lloydminster, Saskatchewan, Canada.  The team took a leave of absence beginning with the 2012–13 hockey season from the Chinook Hockey League and moved to the Sask West Hockey League. They moved again for the 2014–15 season to the Battle River Hockey League. After the BRHL folded for the 2015–16 season, the Border Kings attempted to join as many as 3 other leagues, being declined each time by the league officials. This left the team in limbo moving forward, and they have been on a leave of absence from the 2015–16 season.
 
The Border Kings captured the Allan Cup – Canada's national senior championship – in 2001 and 2007.  Their 2001 Allan Cup win was the first by a Saskatchewan team in 60 years, following the 1941 Regina Rangers.

2007 Allan Cup
The 2007 Allan Cup was held in Stony Plain, Alberta, from April 16–21.  The Kings opened the tournament with a 4–1 loss to the Chinook League champion Bentley (Alberta) Generals.  Border Kings captain Scott Hood opened the scoring, but the Generals tied it on a goal while two men short.  The Kings were stymied the rest of the way.

The Kings next round robin game was against the Halifax Molson Canadians.  Trailing 3–2 after two, the Kings rallied in the third for a 5–4 win.  Their 1–1 record placed them second in their three team pool and set up a quarter-final match-up with the 0–2 Shawinigan Xtreme.

Shawinigan struck just 28 seconds into the game, but the Kings rallied again to lead 3–1 after 20 minutes.  Lloydminster then held off the Xtreme for a 5–1 victory.

The semi-final pitted the Kings against the host Stony Plain Eagles.  Once again, the Kings fell behind, trailing 3–2 after two.  In the third, Aaron Foster, Dalyn Fallscheer, and Kevin Lavallee struck to vault the Kings into the lead.  Stony Plain scored with 54 seconds left, but Lloydminster held on for a 5–4 victory.  Whitby beat Bentley 3–2 in overtime in the other semi-final.

The championship game faced off at 7:30 PM on Saturday, April 21.  Scott Hood scored short-handed to give Lloyd the lead, but Whitby tied it before the end of the first.  Whitby went ahead early in the second, but then for the fourth straight game the Kings enjoyed a three-goal period, and led 4–2 after two.  Whitby scored early in the third but could not pull even.  The Border Kings lifted the Allan Cup after a 4–3 triumph.

Border Kings goaltender Cory McEachran was named Allan Cup MVP.

The Border Kings have hosted the Allan Cup tournament twice, in 2000 and 2005.

Season-by-season record
''Note: GP = Games played, W = Wins, L = Losses, T = Ties, OTL = Overtime losses, Pts = Points, GF = Goals for, GA = Goals against

See also
List of ice hockey teams in Alberta
List of ice hockey teams in Saskatchewan
Lloydminster Bobcats

References

 Lloydminster Border Kings win Allan Cup, cbc.ca
 http://www.allancup.ca

External links
Border Kings website (copy archived March 2009)

Ice hockey teams in Alberta
Ice hockey teams in Saskatchewan
Sport in Lloydminster
Senior ice hockey teams